"Ann-Maria" is the tenth single by the Dutch girl group Luv', released in early 1980 by Carrere Records. This song appears on the formation's third studio album True Luv'. This downtempo composition entered the record charts in Benelux and Germany.

Background 
When Luv' left Philips/Phonogram Records for CNR/Carrere Records in 1979, the trio hoped that its success story would go on. The single Ooh, Yes I Do became successful (even if it didn't reach the results of the million-sellers You're the Greatest Lover or Trojan Horse). The ballad Ann Maria was chosen as a follow-up single and used a Latin American orchestration inspired by ABBA's Chiquitita and Fernando as well as Boney M.'s El Lute. A children's choir was integrated into this song (like ABBA's classic hit "I Have a Dream"). A Spanish version of Ann-Maria came out in Mexico.

Commercial performance
Ann-Maria was a top ten hit in Flanders (Belgium), a top 20 hit in the Netherlands and a top 40 hit in Germany.

Charts

Weekly charts

Year-end charts

References

Bibliography 
"Top 40 Hitdossier 1956–2005 (9e editie)", book by Johan van Slooten, Gottmer Bech Publishing, 2006

1979 songs
1980 singles
Luv' songs
Songs written by Piet Souer
Carrere Records singles